By Way of Deception: The Making and Unmaking of a Mossad Officer  is a nonfiction book by a former katsa (case officer) in the Mossad, Victor Ostrovsky, and Canadian journalist and author Claire Hoy.

Title
The title of the book is what Ostrovsky alleges to be the English translation of the former motto of the Mossad, a phrase from Proverbs 24:6, be-tahbūlōt ta`aseh lekhā milkhamāh (Hebrew: בתחבולות תעשה לך מלחמה).

Ostrovsky has stated that his name is not a pen name and that if he wanted to hide, he would not have written the book in the first place.

Summary
The book starts with Ostrovsky's service in the Israeli Defense Forces. After taking psychological and other preliminary tests, he rejects a potential job as a Mossad assassin but accepts a trainee katsa position.

He specifically addresses the suicide bombing of the US Marine compound in Beirut that killed several hundred US Marines in Lebanon. He says that Mossad learned of the time and location of the attack in advance through its network of informants but told only general information, without the specifics, to the US.

He attributes trafficking heroin as a source of raising funds for operations outside government regulation. He blames Mossad for assassinating Khadir, a PLO diplomat sent by Arafat to start peace negotiations with the Israeli government to prevent an invasion of Lebanon targeting the PLO.

Ostrovsky's's disillusionment grows, culminating in retirement after being scapegoated for a failed attempt at capturing top PLO officials.

The second half alleges other operations between 1971 and 1985, such as Operation Sphinx, in which Iraqi nuclear scientists were recruited while they were in France to gather information about Iraq's nuclear reactor Osiraq. Israel ultimately ends doing so by an Israeli air strike in 1981.

Israeli litigation
In 1990, Israel tried to stop the book sale with a preliminary injunction, arguing that publication would "endanger agents in the field". It was the first (and, to date, only) attempt of a sovereign state to stop a book from being published in the United States. Lawyers for Israel convinced Manhattan Supreme Court Justice Michael J. Dontzin to issue the injunction, preventing the publication and distribution of By Way of Deception.

On September 13, less than 48 hours after the injunction had been issued, an appeals court threw it out. For the week of 7 October 1990, the New York Times best seller list rated the book #1 on its nonfiction list.

See also 

 Kidon

References

1990 non-fiction books
Autobiographies
Current affairs books
Books about the Mossad